Dalia Sofer (born 1972) is an Iranian-born American writer.

Early life and education
Born in Tehran, Iran, she was raised in a Jewish family during revolutionary Iran. At age 11 she moved to New York City. Later she studied French literature at NYU with a minor in creative writing. She received an MFA from Sarah Lawrence College. Her first novel, The Septembers of Shiraz, was published in 2007.

Awards and recognition
Sofer is the recipient of the 2008 PEN/Robert W. Bingham Prize for The Septembers of Shiraz. She has also won a 2007 Whiting Award for fiction, and has been a resident at Yaddo.

Books 
 The Septembers of Shiraz (2007)
 Man of My Time (2020)

References

External links 
Profile at The Whiting Foundation
 New York Times Questions for Dalia Sofer

1972 births
Living people
21st-century American novelists
American women novelists
American people of Iranian-Jewish descent
Jewish American writers
People from Tehran
New York University alumni
Iranian Jews
Sarah Lawrence College alumni
21st-century American women writers
21st-century American Jews
Jewish women writers
Iranian emigrants to the United States